The  is a yōkai, or supernatural being, in Japanese mythology.

Mythology
The koromodako is a terrifying octopus-like yōkai that lives in the ocean that borders Kyoto and Fukui. While they appear small, the koromodako can grow to large sizes if they are threatened. They can become large enough to engulf fish, large ships, and anything that might eat them. When it is done feeding, the koromodaku shrinks back to its normal size and may not be seen for a while.

Popular culture
In Shuriken Sentai Ninninger, the villain Masakage Tsugomori is modeled after a koromodako. In Power Rangers Ninja Steel, he was adapted into General Tynamon.

External links
 Koromodako at Yokai.com

Yōkai
Sea monsters